Taíde is a Portuguese Freguesia in the municipality of Póvoa de Lanhoso. It has an area of 7.34 km² and 1,613 inhabitants, (2011).

Population

References 

Freguesias of Póvoa de Lanhoso